The 1993 UEFA Champions League final was a football match between French club Marseille and Italian club Milan, played on 26 May 1993 at the Olympiastadion in Munich.

The final, which followed the second-ever UEFA Champions League group stage, saw Ivorian-born Marseille defender Basile Boli score the only goal of the match in the 43rd minute with a header to give l'OM their first European Cup title. It was the first time a French team had won the European Cup. No other French side – apart from Monaco-based AS Monaco, who play in the French league system – would reach the final until Paris Saint-Germain in 2020.

Marseille and their club president Bernard Tapie would later be found to have been involved in a match-fixing scandal during the 1992–93 season (in which Marseille allegedly paid Valenciennes to lose a match), which saw them relegated to Division 2 and banned from participation in European football for the following season. As the scandal affected only French league matches, Marseille's status as 1993 European champion was not affected.

The first Champions League final turned out to be the last game of Milan's highly accomplished but injury-prone Dutch forward Marco van Basten, who was 28 at the time; having been subbed off in the 86th minute due to fatigue and yet another ankle injury, he would spend the next two years in recovery before announcing his retirement in August 1995.

Teams 
In the following table, finals until 1992 were in the European Cup era, since 1993 were in the UEFA Champions League era.

Road to the final

Match

Details

Aftermath
Marseille's triumph remains controversial due to accusations of doping alleged by Marcel Desailly, Jean-Jacques Eydelie, Chris Waddle and Tony Cascarino. According to Eydelie, "all (of them) took a series of injections" in the 1993 Champions League final, except Rudi Völler. Desailly and Cascarino claimed that club president Bernard Tapie distributed pills and injections himself. In an interview with French magazine Le Point, Jean-Pierre de Mondenard said Marseille had a blackboard in their team locker room that read "injections for everyone". Tapie only admitted that some players took captagon.

See also
1992–93 UEFA Champions League
A.C. Milan in European football
Olympique de Marseille in European football

References

External links
1992–93 season at UEFA website

European Cup Final 1993
European Cup Final 1993
Champions League Final 1993
Final
1993
Cham
Cham
1990s in Munich
Football in Bavaria
May 1993 sports events in Europe
Sports competitions in Munich